Mont Avic is a mountain in the Graian Alps, in the Aosta Valley, north-western Italy. It has an elevation of  3,006 m. It is included in the Gran Paradiso massif.

Geography 
The peak is located between the municipalities of Champdepraz, Chambave and Champorcher, and gives its name to a regional natural park called Mont Avic Natural Park. 

Mont Avic was ascended for the first time in 1875. The easiest route starts from the Champdepraz valley; at first it follows well marked footpaths and then becomes steeper and more difficult.

References

Mountains of Aosta Valley
Mountains of the Alps
Alpine three-thousanders
Mountains of the Graian Alps
Three-thousanders of Italy